is a railway station on the Nanao Line in the town of Tsubata, Kahoku District, Ishikawa Prefecture, Japan, operated by the West Japan Railway Company (JR West).

Lines

Station layout
The station consists of two unnumbered opposed side platforms connected by a footbridge. The station is attended.

Platforms

Adjacent stations

History
The station opened on June 25, 1902, although a provisional stop had existed at this location since the opening of the Nanao Line on April 24, 1898.  With the privatization of Japanese National Railways (JNR) on April 1, 1987, the station came under the control of JR West.

Passenger statistics
In fiscal 2015, the station was used by an average of 453 passengers daily (boarding passengers only).

Surrounding area
 Tsubata Elementary School
 Katsuzakikan, Japanese style inn

See also
 List of railway stations in Japan

References

External links

  

Railway stations in Ishikawa Prefecture
Stations of West Japan Railway Company
Railway stations in Japan opened in 1902
Nanao Line
Tsubata, Ishikawa